Jack Callum Newman (born 12 February 2002) is a Scottish footballer who plays as a goalkeeper for Dundee United in the Scottish Premiership.

Early life 
Jack Newman was born in Hexham on 12 February 2002. He grew up Stocksfield, but went to neighbouring Prudhoe Community High School. He began playing for Stocksfield Football Club at the age of 6 until the age of 12 where he joined Prudhoe Town playing for both sides. A year later he was picked up by Premier League outfit Sunderland where he progressed through their academy.

Club career

Sunderland

After progressing through the Academy of Light at Sunderland, highly rated by many. Newman signed his first contract with the club. He was the only first year scholar to be in the starting lineup for the beginning of the under-18 Premier League North 2018-19 campaign against Liverpool. After impressing early on Newman suffering an injury and returned in a 2-2 away draw against Stoke City in February 2019. In January 2019 he was sent on loan to local Northern League Division 2 side Chester Le-Street Town on a one-month loan.

In the following season Newman was again a regular starter for the under-18 side continuing with regular International recognition. Newman’s final game was a 3-1 loss to Newcastle United in March 2020. The following week it was announced he would leave the club after a mass clear out at the Stadium of Light seeing 27 players leave the club.

Dundee United

On 10 July 2020, it was announced that Newman had signed for Scottish Premiership side Dundee United after spending pre-season with the Tangerines, putting pen to paper on a two-year deal.

In early February 2021, Newman suffered a knee injury requiring surgery and was sidelined for the rest of the season.

In March 2021, despite being injured he signed a new deal at the club till 2023.

In September 2021 Newman signed for Lowland League side Spartans. In two loan spells over the season he played 16 games and picked up the “Man of the Match” award five times.

In July 2022 Newman signed on loan for Peterhead and the next day played his first game against Aberdeen in the Premier Sports Cup, picking up  “Man of the Match” again on debut. Newman was recalled to United on the 31st of August ending his time at Balmoor.

International career 
Newman is eligible to represent Scotland due to his Grandfather being born and raised in Glasgow. He made his international debut in a under 16 UEFA Development Tournament against England in a 2-1 win which he saved a penalty. He has since been capped at under 17 and under 18 level. He featured on the bench in an under 19 international friendly game against England in September 2020 which was abruptly stopped when it was revealed one of the Scottish coaches had tested positive for coronavirus.

References

Scottish footballers
Association football goalkeepers
Dundee United F.C. players
2002 births
Living people
Sunderland A.F.C. players
Chester-le-Street Town F.C. players
Spartans F.C. players
Peterhead F.C. players
Scottish Professional Football League players
Sportspeople from Hexham
English footballers
English people of Scottish descent
Scotland youth international footballers